The Anápolis Microregion is a microregion of central Goiás state, Brazil. More than sixty percent of the population is concentrated in Anápolis, the regional center.

The land is fertile and well-watered. The towns are small and comparatively prosperous. The largest cities are Anápolis, Inhumas, Jaraguá, and Itaberaí. The most populous municipality is  Anápolis with 325,544 inhabitants.  The least populous is Jesúpolis with 2,201 inhabitants.

The largest municipality in land area is Jaraguá with 1,895.6 km2. The smallest is Damolândia with 84.9 km2.

The area is slightly smaller than Puerto Rico or slightly less than three times the size of the American state of Rhode Island.

Municipalities in the Anápolis Microregion 
The microregion consists of the following municipalities:

See also 
Microregions in Goiás

References

Microregions of Goiás